"Désenchantée" (feminine of désenchanté, which is French for "Disenchanted" or "Disappointed") is a song recorded by French singer-songwriter Mylène Farmer. The first single from her third studio album L'autre..., it was released on 18 March 1991 and achieved great success in France, topping the charts for more than two months. It was Farmer's most successful song and is generally considered her signature song.

In 2002, the song was covered by Belgian singer Kate Ryan, whose version reached number one in Belgium and became a top-20 hit across Europe.

Mylène Farmer version

Background and writing
After a two-year absence from the media, Farmer launched this new single "Désenchantée" on 18 March 1991, three weeks before the release of the album L'autre.... At the time, many demonstrations were organized by students throughout France to protest against their status and conditions for learning, and the Gulf War was raging.  The pessimistic lyrics of the song strongly echoed the feelings toward worldwide events and thus certainly contributed to its success. According to the sound engineer, Thierry Rogen, "Désenchantée" was recorded four times. Boutonnat originally wanted a jerky song with techno influences, but Rogen convinced him to add drums and a more funk sound. The text was inspired by the 1934 book On the Heights of Despair by the Romanian philosopher Emil Cioran.

Very quickly, the song achieved great success in France, becoming Farmer's biggest hit. As a result, the song was also released in other countries including Canada, UK, Austria, Switzerland, Belgium, Netherlands, Germany, Australia and Japan. There were many formats for this song.

Lyrics and music
"Désenchantée" has a melodious tune, and its lyrics have "unexpected hyphenate which dissect the phrases in small sections". This song also has "a very dancing rhythmic color" thanks to the chords played on the piano in the introduction, the bright and chiseled percussion or vocals (performed by Debbie Davis and Carole Fredericks) which bring out the refrain. In the lyrics, the singer expresses her great lucidity on the absurdity of the world and discusses topics related to the existentialism.

Music video
The music video was produced by Requiem Publishing and Heathcliff SA and directed by Laurent Boutonnat, who also wrote the script. Shot for five days (from 18 to 23 February 1991) in Budapest, Hungary, with a budget of about 240,000 euros, this video was one of the longest at the time (10:12) and used many extras: 119 children and many Hungarian actors such as Erika Francz Jánofné. There is another version shortened to four minutes. The video for the single features a riot in what appears to be a concentration camp or gulag facility where adults and children are subjected to forced labor and being treated abysmally by armed guards. The riot scenes are quite realistically shot and contain much violence. The anthem-like song goes well with the visual background. According to French magazine Instant-Mag, this music video has a fairly similar structure to that of "Tristana". It has a gloomy story, an ambiguous ending, allows various interpretations, and deals with the theme of messianism. Farmer "symbolically embodies the spirit of freedom". The final scene is inspired by the 1830 painting La Liberté guidant le peuple by Eugène Delacroix.

The music video is included on the videos albums L'autre and Music Videos I.

Promotion and performances on tours
During the shooting of the music video, Farmer also gave a lengthy interview to French television host Laurent Boyer, in Budapest. The interview was later aired on M6, on 7 April 1991. Farmer also performed the song live on Studio 22, broadcast on the radio RTL on 15 May 1991.

In 1991, Farmer appeared on five television shows to promote the songs: Sacrée soirée (17 April, TF1), La Une est à vous (20 April, TF1), Stars 90 (13 May, TF1; Farmer also sang "L'Autre"), Tous à la une (31 May, TF1) and Vela d'Oro at Riva del Garda  (Rai Uno, 4 October). On these occasions, Farmer had short hair (as in the music video) and wore white clothes. The performances were accompanied by a choreographed collective dance.

The song was performed on the 1996 tour, the Mylenium Tour, the 2006 tour à Bercy, 2009 tour, the Timeless tour, as well as the Mylène Farmer 2019 residency at the Paris La Défense Arena.

Chart performance
"Désenchantée" was the most aired song on radio in 1991 and was also the highest grossing song in 1991, 1992, and 2006, according to the SACEM.

The single debuted on the French Single Chart at number 12 on 13 April 1991, climbing to number one two weeks later, where it stayed for nine consecutive weeks. Then it fell slowly back down the chart, remaining in the top ten for eighteen weeks and in the chart for 25 weeks in total. In the 2010s, the song re-entered the chart many times : on 1 October 2016, it was number four due to downloads, and number 26 on 16 December 2017 when a maxi vinyl was released. It was the best-selling single by a female artist in France and was certified Gold disc by the SNEP.

The song had some success in Belgium where it reached number 18 and in the Netherlands (number three). In the other countries where it was released, "Désenchantée" achieved moderate success. In Switzerland, the single peaked at number 23 on 9 February 1992. In Austria, the single charted for eleven weeks, from 11 August to 20 October 1991, reaching a peak of number 16 on 29 September. In Germany, the song only ranked at number 46.

Cover versions
The song was covered by many artists, including : 
 In 1996, Lio recorded her own version for the compilation album 1991 - Les Plus Belles Chansons françaises.
 In 1998, the French band Alliage covered the song on Hit Machine, but this version was not released as a single.
 In 1999, the French singer Allan Théo performed the song on stage.
 The Belgian dance-music singer Kate Ryan in 2002. This version is perhaps the best known cover, because it was released as a single and achieved a great success in many countries.
 In 2002, Liloo covered the song which was remixed by Mad' House.
 In 2005, the song was recorded by Pascal Obispo and Zazie and is available on Les Enfoirés' album 2005 : Le Train des Enfoirés.
 The song was covered by the Swedish artist Christer Björkman.
 In 2006, Cynthia Brown, Cyril Cinélu, Domy Fidanza and Elfy Ka covered the song in a rock version for an album of the Star Academy.
 In 2008, German Dance Band Siria (An offshoot project of Cascada) Covered the song in a "Handz Up/Euro-Trance Format.
 In 2018, French duo Madame Monsieur covered the song in an electro-pop version
 The lyrics of Electronic's 1992 single "Disappointed" were partly inspired by "Désenchantée".

Formats and track listings
These are the formats and track listings of single releases of "Désenchantée":

 7" single - France, Germany
 12" maxi - France
 CD single - Japan

 CD maxi - France, Germany, Canada1, Australia

 Cassette, double length - France, Canada (promo)

 12" maxi, double length - Promo - France

 12" maxi - Germany, Canada2

 12" maxi - Promo - English version - Canada

 7" single - Promo - United Kingdom

 7" single - Promo - Italy

1 French promo and English promo versions 
2 Mainstream and promo versions

Official versions

Credits and personnel
 Mylène Farmer – lyrics
 Laurent Boutonnat – music
 Requiem Publishing – editions
 Polydor – recording company
 Marianne Rosenstiehl (Sygma) – photo
 Com'N.B – design

Charts, certifications and sales

Peak positions

Year-end charts

Certifications

Kate Ryan cover version

In 2002, Belgian singer Kate Ryan released her dance-pop style version of "Désenchantée" as the third single from her debut album Different, released in the same year. This version was successful in several European countries.

In 2009, the song was remastered and remixed by Paris Avenue, with dance/electronic style. The remix was included in Ryan's greatest hits album French Connection.
In 2020 French hardtrance DJ Trym released a re-work.

Track listings
CD single

CD maxi

Chart performances
In the Flanders region of Belgium, the single went directly into the top ten, then reached number one on the third week and stayed there for six weeks. It spent ten weeks in the top three and twenty weeks in the top ten. After 27 weeks on the chart, it fell off the top 50. The single also reached number one in the Belgian dance chart. The single was also very successful in other European countries, such as Austria, Germany, Hungary, and Norway, where it reached the top three of the singles chart and stayed for several weeks in the top ten.

Weekly charts

Year-end charts

Certifications

References

External links
  Mylène Farmer — "Désenchantée" All about the song, on Mylene.net

1991 songs
1991 singles
2002 singles
Mylène Farmer songs
Kate Ryan songs
Songs with lyrics by Mylène Farmer
Songs with music by Laurent Boutonnat
Music videos directed by Laurent Boutonnat
Ultratop 50 Singles (Wallonia) number-one singles
SNEP Top Singles number-one singles
Polydor Records singles